Karl-Gustav Kaisla (4 October 1943 in Helsinki – 21 September 2012 in Helsinki) was a Finnish ice hockey referee. He officiated in three World Championships and in one Olympic Tournament.

He was the referee for the Miracle on Ice game on February 22 1980, when the United States faced the Soviet Union during the 1980 Olympic Games at Lake Placid.

After his active hockey career was finished Kaisla worked as a supervisor of other referees.

See also
 Miracle on Ice
 1980 Winter Olympics
 Officials during the Miracle on Ice

References

1943 births
2012 deaths
Finnish ice hockey officials